The Gold Of Malabar is a 1967 thriller novel by the British writer Berkely Mather. Mather had made his name as a novelist with his 1960 work The Pass Beyond Kashmir, which like The Gold of Malabar this was set in the Indian subcontinent.

While in jail in Goa for manslaughter, merchant seaman Michael O’Reilly discovers the location of buried treasure off the Bombay coast and escapes from prison in order to hunt for it.

References

Bibliography
 Pine, John C. 199 Ways to Review a Book: A Librarian's Readings in the Novel of the Sixties. Scarecrow Press, 1971.
 Reilly, John M. Twentieth Century Crime & Mystery Writers. Springer, 2015.

1967 British novels
British thriller novels
Novels by Berkely Mather
Novels set in India
William Collins, Sons books